Reed Seed is a 1978 studio album by jazz saxophonist Grover Washington Jr. released on the Motown label.

Track listing
 "Do Dat" (John E. Blake Jr., Leonard "Doc" Gibbs Jr.) - 4:27
 "Step'n' Thru" (Richard Lee Steacker) - 6:15
 "Reed Seed (Trio Tune)" (Grover Washington Jr.) - 4:54
 "Maracas Beach" (James "Sid" Simmons) - 4:48
 "Santa Cruzin" (John E. Blake Jr., Tyrone Brown, Leonard "Doc" Gibbs Jr., James "Sid" Simmons, Richard Lee Steacker, Millard "Pete" Vinson, Grover Washington Jr.) - 6:54
 "Just the Way You Are" (Billy Joel) - 4:46
 "Loran's Dance" (Grover Washington Jr.) - 7:37

Personnel 
 Grover Washington Jr. – soprano saxophone, alto saxophone, tenor saxophone, baritone saxophone, flute, arrangements (1, 2, 3, 5, 6, 7)
 James "Sid" Simmons – acoustic piano, Fender Rhodes, clavinet, arrangements (4, 5)
 John Blake Jr. – Polymoog, ARP Omni, ARP String Ensemble, electric violin, acoustic piano (1), clavinet (1), Fender Rhodes (6), backing vocals, arrangements (1, 5)
 Richard Lee Steacker – electric guitars, backing vocals, arrangements (2)
 Tyrone Brown – acoustic bass, electric bass
 Millard "Pete" Vinson – drums
 Leonard "Doc" Gibbs – percussion, backing vocals, arrangements (1, 5) 
 Derrick Graves – arrangements (2)
 Jeannine Otis – backing vocals
 Lita Boggs – backing vocals 
 Rita Boggs – backing vocals, vocal arrangements (1)

Production 
 Grover Washington Jr. – producer 
 Nils Salminen – engineer
 Rodney Perry – assistant engineer 
 Rudy Van Gelder – mastering at Van Gelder Studios (Englewood Cliffs, New Jersey).
 Norm Ung – art direction, design 
 Beverly Parker – photography

Charts

Singles

References

External links
 Grover Washington Jr.-Reed Seed at Discogs
http://sudo.3.pro.tok2.com/Quest/cards/G/GroverWashingtonJr/ReedSeed_x.html

1978 albums
Motown albums
Grover Washington Jr. albums